On Translating Homer, published in January 1861, was a printed version of the series of public lectures given by Matthew Arnold as Professor of Poetry at Oxford between 3 November and 18 December 1860.

Arnold's purpose was to discuss how his principles of literary criticism applied to the two Homeric epics and to the translation of a classical text. He comments with disapproval on John Ruskin's 1860 review article "The English translators of Homer" in the National Review. He gives much space to comparing and criticizing already-published translations of the epics, notably

 George Chapman’s Odyssey
 Alexander Pope’s Iliad
 William Cowper's Iliad
 Ichabod Charles Wright's Iliad (vol. 1, 1859; vol. 2 was to appear in 1865)
 Francis W. Newman's Iliad (1856)

He adds polite comments on William Maginn's Homeric Ballads (which first appeared in Fraser's Magazine, where Arnold intended to publish these lectures).

Arnold identifies four essential qualities of Homer the poet to which the translator must do justice:that he is eminently rapid; that he is eminently plain and direct both in the evolution of his thought and in the expression of it, that is, both in his syntax and in his words; that he is eminently plain and direct in the substance of his thought, that is, in his matter and ideas; and, finally, that he is eminently noble

After a discussion of the meters employed by previous translators, and in other existing English narrative poetry, he argues the need for a translation of the Iliad in hexameters in a poetical dialect, like the original. He notes the German translations of the Iliad and Odyssey into hexameters by Johann Heinrich Voss. He quotes English hexameter translations of short Homeric passages by himself and by E. C. Hawtrey and also surveys original English hexameter poetry, including

 Arthur Hugh Clough, The Bothie of Tober-na-Vuolich
 Henry Wadsworth Longfellow, Evangeline  
 
Arnold reserved much space for the criticism of the recently published translation of the Iliad into a ballad-like metre by F. W. Newman. Newman took offence at Arnold's public criticism of his translation, and published a reply, Homeric Translation in Theory and Practice. To this Arnold in turn responded, with a last lecture, given at Oxford on 30 November 1861, afterwards separately published in March 1862 under the title On Translating Homer: last words.

Bibliography 
 Matthew Arnold, On the classical tradition ed. R. H. Super. Ann Arbor: University of Michigan Press, 1960. [Text with commentary.]
 F. W. Newman, Homeric Translation in Theory and Practice: a reply to Matthew Arnold, Esq. London, 1861. (e-text from victorianprose.org)
 Ichabod Charles Wright, A Letter to the Dean of Canterbury on the Homeric Lectures of Matthew Arnold. London, 1864.

External links 
 Matthew Arnold, On Translating Homer, e-text (PDF) from victorianprose.org
 On Translating Homer: Last Words (PDF)

History of translation
Translation publications
Books of literary criticism
Works by Matthew Arnold
1861 non-fiction books
Homer